The MACS3 Loading Computer System is a computer controlled loading system for commercial vessels, developed by Navis. Prior to October, 2017 it was offered by Interschalt maritime systems GmbH, before by Seacos Computersysteme & Software GmbH.

MACS3 consists of computer hardware and a range of software, which aim to minimize the operational load while loading a vessel, and to prevent any hard limitations from being breached.

Design principles 
The software architecture and user interface of the MACS3 Loading Computer System are designed according to the standard ISO 16155:2006 Ships and marine technology - Computer applications - Shipboard loading instruments, and to the following Rules and Recommendations:

DNVGL Class Guideline DNVGL-CG-0053 : Approval and certification of the software of loading computer systems

ABS Guidance Notes for the Application of Ergonomics to Marine Systems

BV Rules for the Classification of Steel Ships, Pt C, Ch 3, Sec 3 "COMPUTER BASED SYSTEMS"

IACS Recommendation on Loading Instruments (No 48)

Software structure 
The software of MACS3 Loading Computer System includes the MACS3 Basic Loading Program, performing functions of Categories A and B according to the ISO 16155:2006 and (optionally)  a range of additional modules and programs, performing functions of Category C:

PolarCode Basic Module
BELCO Container Management Module
DAGO Dangerous Goods Modules
StowMan Stowage Planning
SEALASH Lashing Module
MIXCARGO General Cargo Module
RoRo Module
Crane Operation Module
Bulk Carrier Modules
Tanker Modules
BallastMAN Ballast Water Exchange Module
Voyage History
DastyMAN Damage Stability
Online Program (Tanks Online)

The system runs under Windows 10 Professional 64Bit.

Programs and Features

MACS3 Basic Loading Program 
MACS3 Basic Loading Program is designed for all vessel types (containership, tanker, Bulk carrier, general cargo, RoRo, Passenger ship) in accordance with the unified IACS Requirement L5 "Onboard Computers for Stability Calculations". It is approved by all leading classification societies: 
LR,
ABS,
DNVGL,
BV,
ClassNK,
KR,
CCS.

MACS3 Basic Loading Program performs:
Ship stability and strength calculations, covering all pertinent international regulations like e.g. IMO A.749
Numerical and graphical results for metacentric height GM , trim, heel, draft, shear forces, bending moments and torsion
Metacentric height GM check against various approved GM requirement curves
GZ curve for dynamic stability
Automatic wind pressure calculation
Automatic ballast tank optimization
Tank plan with visual editing
Optional online measurement of tank levels and draft (sold separately)
User interface with tabbed main window for multiple views, all fully customizable
Screen and print reports in PDF, HTML and XML formats

MACS3 Basic Loading Program supports client–server software architecture for distributed cargo management and allows the complete loading condition (container, tanks, general cargo and constant items) to be stored in a single compressed mxml-file, making it very easy for you to exchange loading conditions between ship and office.

BELCO Container Management Module 
BELCO enhances the MACS3 Basic Loading Program with easy-to-use container management features, enabling to create the valid Stowage plan for container ships. It works with high level of integration into MACS3.NET, so any changes to the container cargo are immediately reflected in the MACS3 stability and strength calculations. The results of the MACS3 and BELCO can be displayed simultaneously at any time.

The MACS3 screen and print reporting in PDF, HTML and XML formats is also fully available to BELCO.

Data Features:

Verified Gross Mass (VGM) functionality
Variable container sizes
Wide range of information per container: ISO 6346 (both old and new) and custom types, weight, ports of loading/discharge/final/transshipment, operator etc.
Calculation of vertical, transversal and longitudinal centre of gravity for each container
Full UN EDIFACT/BAPLIE support (BAPLIE 1.5, 2.0, 2.1, 2.2 and 3.1)
UN LOCODE database
Port rotation with date/time and quays

Cargo Handling
Efficient pre-stowage and pre-discharge functions, bay-, row-, tier- or port-wise
Visual editing of reefer positions and hot areas
Loading/discharge list
Plan view
Fully functional layer view
Fully functional single page view
Top view with various criteria
Block shift
Multi-step Undo
Hatch-cover handling
Symbolic presentation of pier
Result table with free selection of row/column criteria, including sub-rows, sub-columns and subtotals

On-the-fly and combined checks:

Visibility (IMO and Panama) check with blind sectors in relation to trim/draft change
Segregation of Dangerous goods,
Restows,
Lashing forces,
Lashing inventory,
Stack weights (maximum stack weight according to the shipyard, as well as 20' stacks weights in holds according to the Classification Societies),
"Flying" containers,
Reefer plug positions,
Hatch cover clearance,
Compatibility of container types with ship design,
Load and destination locations according to the UN Locode databases and to the Port Call List,
Overdimensions,
Handling instructions and Loading Remarks (like "away from boiler", "on-deck-only"),
Container numbers,
False empties, etc.

Visualization
Multiple bay views with individual settings
Visualization of hatch covers and tweendecks
About 150 different container criteria for visualization and statistics
Up to 12 information areas with text per container
Containers can be coloured by a variety of criteria, e.g. by port of discharge
Multiple colours per container
Longitudinal section and top view with tanks, holds, containers and visibility lines
Commodity list with possible restrictions
Realistic 3D view – both Helicopter and Personal (Walking) modes

DAGO Dangerous Goods Modules 
Checks the fulfilment of the stowage and segregation requirements imposed by the latest version of the IMDG code (DAGO Part I)
Includes a database of dangerous goods with all relevant information from the IMDG code and the Emergency Schedules (EmS) (DAGO Part I)
Unlimited number of dangerous goods both per container and per ship
Company-specific blacklists of IMDG classes and UN numbers
CFR 49, list of CDC goods
Takes orientation of reefer containers into account
Fire Fighting and Safety Plan  (DAGO Part II)
Medical First Aid Guide (MFAG) (DAGO Part III)

StowMan Stowage Planning 
Stowage planning for on board use
Import and export of container data in text files or EDIFACT / BAPLIE, export of MOVINS, COARRI, COPRAR

SEALASH Lashing Module 
Calculation of forces in container securing systems according to the rules of the classification societies LR, ABS, DNVGL, BV, ClassNK, KR, CCS. 
Following lashing notations are supported: Route Specific Container Stowage (RSCS and RSCS+ for both long haul voyages and limited short voyages, taking into account the weather forecasts) of DNVGL; CSSA and CSSA-R for ClassNK; Voyage- and Weather-dependent Boxmax (V,W) notation for LR; Unrestricted and Worldwide for BV; CLP and route-specific CLP-V Notation for ABS.
Modelling of several internal and external lashing systems, checking the physical possibility to lash
Calculation of lash forces per stack, with exceeding values in red
Flying hints show exceeding lashing forces for containers
Calculation of maximum weight of an additional container
Visual lashing mode
Lashing equipment inventory
Check of available lash eyes
Main parameter table

MIXSTOW 3D and Steel Coil: General Cargo, Ro/Ro and Ferry-Modules 
Manages all kinds of cargo: trailers, single parts, homogeneous surface cargo
Definition of polygon shaped cargo
Visual arrangement of cargo with drag-and-drop
Automatic displaying of the documents, associated with single cargo units
Visual alignment of centres of gravity
User-extendable cargo types library (with cargo geometry definition)
Lane/SECU-Loading, Top-loading, Multi-Loading in areas, Side-View-Loading
Free rotation of cargo
Loading checks (load capacity, dangerous cargo, overlapping, hit testing)
Cutting stock optimization for available stowage area
Zooming/scrolling, meter-  and frame- rulers and grids

Crane Operation Module 
Simulates a crane operation in single or combined mode
Visual presentation of the reach and the safe working load in a top view
Ballasting using heeling tanks in shift tanks mode
All relevant stability and strength criteria can be supervised during simulation
Logging of crane motion and results

Bulk Carrier Modules 
Bulk strength for calculation of longitudinal strength in flooded condition according to IACS rule 17
BULKLIM checks load limitations depending on the structure of the double bottom given by the class
LoadMan for optimization of cargo in holds and loading / discharging sequences
Grain Program for calculation of grain stability and reports, e.g. according to the National Cargo Bureau (United States of America)

Tanker Modules 
Proven Ullage Report including ASTM table based volume correction
Vessel experience factor and cargo history
Dangerous goods data base (IBC, CHRIS Code) printout of substance information page, cargo segregation and compatibility check
MFAG code and EMS integration, emergency simulation and easy links to the information relevant for the actual loaded cargo

BallastMAN Ballast Water Exchange Module 
BallastMAN manages a ship's ballast water exchange on the high seas in accordance with IMO Resolution A.868 (20).
Sequences of tank emptying and filling can be completely planned and executed, thus making sure that the exchange is carried out both safely and efficiently. During Planning Stage BallastMAN determines the fastest and safest sequence, continually calculating stability and longitudinal strength. During Execution Stage BallastMAN monitors the tank levels online, issues instructions when to operate pumps and valves and warns if a crucial deviation from the plan is detected.
BallastMAN creates the Ballast Water Reporting Form required by U.S. Coast Guard / NBIC, AQIS and New Zealand

Voyage History 
Pre-calculates the changes in stability during a voyage resulting from the consumption of bunker
Graphical and numerical history and reports

DastyMAN Damage Stability Calculation 
Deterministic damage stability calculation using the lost buoyancy method
Required damage conditions as laid down by the classification society are calculated automatically when cargo or bunker has been changed
The calculation results are checked against the appropriate IMO criteria, e.g. IBC-code, SOLAS

Online Program 
HSMS (Hull Stress Monitoring System) interface
Interfaces to a wide range of tank automation systems
Recurring automatic update of loading condition by the current tank readings
Each tank may be switched online or offline individually

Market Penetration 
The onboard loading computer MACS3 is being used in a wide range of container vessels, multipurpose vessels, bulk carriers, tanker vessels, roro vessels and passenger vessels. Its ship library includes more than 6,500 ship profiles. For the container vessel segment, MACS3 holds a share of approximately 65%.

The MACS3 loading computer software has been in use for training purposes since 1999. Initially only available to Germany naval schools, it is now also deployed at European and Chinese maritime universities.

References

External links 
 MACS3 Loading Computer System on the page of Navis

Port infrastructure
Transport software